The 2015 Atlanta Sharks season was the second season for the American Indoor Football (AIF) franchise, and their second season in the AIF. After Week 5 of the regular season, the Sharks stopped playing all of their games, teams that had the Sharks scheduled either didn't play the games, or played a replacement team that did not count for a win in the league standings.

Schedule

Regular season

Standings

Roster

References

Atlanta Sharks
Atlanta Sharks
Atlanta Sharks